Kazys Maksvytis (born 15 June 1977) is a Lithuanian professional basketball coach who is currently the head coach for Lithuania men's national basketball team and Žalgiris Kaunas.

Coaching career

Professional clubs
From 2011 to 2012, Maksvytis was the head coach of the Lithuanian club Sakalai Vilnius.

On 2012 he became the head coach of Neptūnas Klaipėda. In 2012–13 season he guided the team to Lithuanian Basketball League third place. In 2013–14 season Maksvytis won the second place in the Lithuanian Basketball League and won the right to play in the EuroLeague next season.

On December 2015, did Maksvytis was appointed as the head coach for Lietkabelis Panevėžys. In the following 2016–17 season, he helped the team reach their first ever LKL finals, winning the silver medal after losing 4–1 to Žalgiris Kaunas. In June 2017, Maksvytis returned to Neptūnas Klaipėda, guiding them to a third place finish and bronze medals in both 2018 and 2019. 

In June 2019, Maksvytis signed as the new head coach for Russian club Parma Basket of the VTB United League.
On February 27, he decided to leave Parma after Russia's invasion in Ukraine, almost a month later it was announced he would take over Žalgiris in the 2022-2023 season. However, after the team lost two consecutive Lithuanian League games for the first time in seven years, Jure Zdovc was let go and Maksvytis actually started the job earlier - on 11 April, 2022.

National teams
While the head coach of the youth men's teams, Maksvytis won the gold medal in the European 2008 U16, 2010 U18, 2011 U19 and the 2012 U20 championships. On 14 September, 2021 Maksvytis was appointed the new head coach of Lithuanian National team.

References

External links
 Coaching Profile 
 Coach Profile 

1977 births
BC Lietkabelis coaches
BC Neptūnas coaches
Lithuanian basketball coaches
Living people
Sportspeople from Kretinga
Parma Basket coaches
BC Sakalai coaches